Sawteeth (sometimes Resagonia Mountain or Sawtooth) is a mountain located in Essex County, New York. 
The mountain is part of the Great Range of the Adirondack Mountains.
The mountain's name comes from the serrated appearance of its summit ridge.
Sawteeth is on a spur ridge of the Great Range, which branches off to the southeast from Gothics.

Sawteeth stands within the watershed of the East Branch of the Ausable River, which drains into Lake Champlain, thence into Canada's Richelieu River, the Saint Lawrence River, and into the Gulf of Saint Lawrence.
The west side and south end of Sawteeth drain into Shanty Brook, thence into the East Branch of the Ausable River between Upper and Lower Ausable Lake. 
The east side and north end of Sawteeth drain into Cascade Brook, thence into the East Branch below Lower Ausable Lake.

Sawteeth is within the High Peaks Wilderness Area of Adirondack Park.

See also 
 List of mountains in New York
 Northeast 111 4,000-footers
 Adirondack High Peaks
 Adirondack Forty-Sixers

Notes

External links 
  Peakbagger.com: Sawteeth
  Summitpost.org: Sawteeth
 

Mountains of Essex County, New York
Adirondack High Peaks
Mountains of New York (state)